Michael Italicus or Italikos (fl. 1136–66) was a Byzantine medical instructor (didaskalos iatron) at the Pantokrator hospital that had been established by Emperor John II Komnenos (r. 1118–43) in 1136. Pantokrator was a medical centre, at which Italicus lectured and explained physicians Hippocrates (460–370 BC) and Galen (129–200), and illustrated diseases through patient cases. His pupil Theodore Prodromos described smallpox. Between 1147 and 1166 he served as the Archbishop of Philippopolis.

He wrote a monody on the death of Andronikos, son of Alexios I. He delivered basilikoi logoi (encomia) to the emperors John II and Manuel I.

References

12th-century Byzantine bishops
12th-century Byzantine physicians
12th-century archbishops
Byzantine archbishops
History of Plovdiv
12th-century Byzantine scientists
12th-century Eastern Orthodox bishops
12th-century Byzantine writers